Aleksandr Mastyanin (born 28 November 1952) is a Soviet sports shooter. He competed in the mixed 50 metre rifle prone event at the 1980 Summer Olympics.

References

1952 births
Living people
Soviet male sport shooters
Olympic shooters of the Soviet Union
Shooters at the 1980 Summer Olympics
Place of birth missing (living people)